Jane Jones may refer to:

Jane Wenham-Jones (born 1964), author, journalist, presenter
Jane C. Wright (1919–2013), also known as Jane Jones, cancer researcher and surgeon
Jane Elizabeth Jones (1813–1896), abolitionist
Jane Jones (printer) (died 1739), Irish printer, bookseller, and newspaper proprietor
Jane Jones (actress), actress in the 1937 film Slave Ship
Jane Jones, a character in the 2004 film Closer

See also
Janie Jones (disambiguation)